Stanley Fausst Yolles (April 19, 1919 - January 12, 2001) was an American psychiatrist who was head of the National Institute of Mental Health from 1964-1970. He resigned after publicly clashing with the Nixon administration over drug policy.

Life 

Yolles was born in New York City to Louis, who owned a dress factory, and Rose, a milliner. Both of his parents were Jewish immigrants from Galicia (at the time, part of Austria, but after World War I, Poland). He graduated from Brooklyn College in 1939, received his master's degree in parasitology from Harvard University in 1940 and graduated from New York University College of Medicine in 1950. During World War II he served with the United States Army Corps of Engineers as a parasitologist in Latin America, becoming associate director of the Army's Sector Epidemiological Laboratory in the British West Indies. After the war he was commissioned in the United States Public Health Service and did his residency at Public Health Service Hospital in Lexington, Kentucky. It was there when he decided to turn his focus away from infectious disease to psychiatry.

Yolles joined the National Institute of Mental Health in 1954 as a staff psychiatrist, He became associate director of the community services branch in 1955, and later director of community services. After becoming deputy director in 1963, he became director the following year after the retirement of Robert Felix.

In 1967, Yolles was part of the first mental health delegation to the USSR.

As director of the NIMH, Yolles spoke out against strict drug laws, saying that punishments for marijuana possession were worse than the crime in front of congressional committees. Angered by this, Richard Nixon removed Yolles from his position on June 2, 1970. Yolles responded with a letter of resignation that condemned Nixon for abandoning the mentally ill.

In 1971 Yolles was asked to create the department of psychiatry at the State University of New York at Stony Brook, which he headed until 1981. In 1982 he became emeritus status as professor of psychiatry at SUNY, Stony Brook.

Awards and honors 

At the time of his dismissal from NIMH, Yolles was assistant surgeon general and a rear admiral in the Public Health Service. He was also a recipient of the HEW's Meritorious Service Medal and the Distinguished Service Medal.

Personal life 

Yolles married Tamarath Knigin, whom he met at Brooklyn College. Also a physician in the PHS and an associate dean at Stoney Brook medical school, she died in 1985. He is survived by daughters Melanie Yolles of Manhattan and Dr. Jennifer C. Yolles of Syracuse, as well as three grandchildren.

References 

American psychiatrists
1919 births
2001 deaths
New York University Grossman School of Medicine alumni
Brooklyn College alumni
Harvard Graduate School of Arts and Sciences alumni
United States Public Health Service personnel